C. V. L. Narasimha Rao is an Indian character actor, and thespian known for his works in Telugu cinema, theatre, television, and radio. Rao is one of the senior member, and legal advisor in the Movie Artist's Association of Hyderabad.

Career
Narasimha Rao is a trained criminal lawyer, and advocate, who later turned into acting through Telefilms.

Selected filmography
As actor

References

External links

Living people
Telugu people
Indian lawyers
Indian barristers
Indian comedians
21st-century Indian male actors
Nandi Award winners
Male actors from Telangana
Male actors in Telugu cinema
Indian male film actors
All India Radio people
20th-century Indian dramatists and playwrights
21st-century Indian dramatists and playwrights
Year of birth missing (living people)